A toadstool is a mushroom.

Toadstool may also refer to:
Toadstool Geologic Park, an American park located in Nebraska
Toadstool (short story), a 1966 James Bond short story by the Harvard Lampoon
Princess Toadstool, former name of Princess Peach, character in the Super Mario video game series